Roger Chang  is a computer enthusiast and American television personality best known for his time as a segment producer and his appearances on TechTV's Call for Help and The Screen Savers. He was a senior producer at Revision3.

Early life
Chang attended Thomas Downey High School in Modesto, California. Upon graduating from high school, Chang continued his education at San Francisco State University. During his appearance on TWiT Live on April 4, 2008, Chang stated that he was an agnostic and a libertarian.

Career
In 1998, Chang was hired by ZDTV (later TechTV) as an associate producer. While working at TechTV, Chang was involved with the production of two popular productions; Call for Help, which was a live call-in show for fans seeking technology assistance and The Screen Savers, a television show centered around computers, new technologies, and their adaptations in the world. He was also an on-air talent at times as well as an occasional fill-in host on Call for Help. Chang remained in this capacity until the spring of 2004.

On March 25, 2004, Comcast's G4 gaming channel announced a merger with TechTV. This move became controversial among loyal fans of TechTV. Around May 6, G4 announced the termination of 250 employees from the San Francisco office by July 10, 2004, allowing approximately 80 to 100 employees to transition to G4's main office in Los Angeles, California if they agreed to relocate there. Chang was terminated and did not make the move to Los Angeles.

In late 2004, an early pre-alpha version of ScopeTech, a technology opinion website founded by Dan Huard with Chang and Robert Padbury, was created. Chang no longer contributes to ScopeTech.

Chang left the gaming website GameSpot in late 2005 to work for DL.TV, which covers a wide range of technology-related topics and is streamed live each Thursday (it was streamed live twice weekly on Tuesdays and Thursdays until episode 189). After serving as a camera operator and a regular guest host, he succeeded Patrick Norton as producer and host for DL.TV.

From March to October 2006, Chang appeared on the weekly technology podcast from Ziff Davis media called Whats New Now hosted by Jim Louderback.

Chang announced in December 2007 that he would be leaving DL.TV to join Revision3 in January 2008.

Chang also appears as a panelist on This Week in Tech. On the show he explained he was leaving DL.TV to join Patrick Norton and Jim Louderback at Revision3.

Chang has joined Tekzilla and Systm vidcasts at Revision3 as the senior producer (and probable feature host).

Chang co-hosts a podcast with Tom Merritt, East Meets West, which deals with various topics such as sports, technology, and politics.

The company UCMore has used, for marketing purposes for their search tool, a quote from Chang -- “I started using it two days ago and I can't stop using it"—which Chang has said was taken out of context by the Google AdSense advertising system. He explained in an episode of This Week in Tech that the quote is misleading because it was taken from an episode of "Call for Help" that aired several years earlier.

See also
 Revision3
 East Meets West
 TechTV
 TWiT
 Leo Laporte
 GameSpot
 Kevin Rose Co-founder of Revision3

References

External links
 Tekzilla.com
 Revision3.com
 TWiT.tv
 Subbrilliant.com
 ScopeTech.net

Living people
Television personalities from California
American libertarians
San Francisco State University alumni
TechTV people
American agnostics
Year of birth missing (living people)